Dolores Candelaria Mora Vega (November 17, 1866 – June 7, 1936) known professionally as Lola Mora,  was a sculptor born in San Miguel de Tucumán, in Argentina. She is known today as a rebel and a pioneer of women in her artistic field.

Early life
Dolores was the daughter of Romualdo Alejandro Mora, a prosperous landowner of Tucumán Province of Spanish origin and Regina Vega. She was the third born of seven children, three boys and four girls. Her parents (unusual behavior for the time) decided that the girls should also have the best education possible. In 1870 when Lola was four years old her parents moved the family to San Miguel del Tucumán.  At seven years of age,  she was a boarding school pupil at Colegio Sarmiento de [Tucumán Province]. In 1885, within two days both her parents died. Her older sister Paula Mora Vega married the engineer Guillermo Rucker, and together took care of the orphans.

Education 

At 20 years of age she began painting portraits, but soon turned to sculpting marble and granite. She studied art in her home province and then, with a scholarship, in Rome, Italy, studying under Costantino Barbella and Giulio Monteverde.  In 1900 she returned to Argentina and, with government connections, was commissioned to create two bas-reliefs for the Historical House of Tucumán.

As her career developed, her sensual style and her status as a female artist made her controversial.  In 1903 her Nereids Fountain, created for the city of Buenos Aires, met bureaucratic problems at the city's Deliberative Council, which had the sculpture moved around from place to place.

Near the end of her life, she entered into some extravagant business (such as financing petroleum surveys in Salta), and then retired with only a pension to support herself. After her death in Buenos Aires, in poverty and obscurity, her friends burned her letters, mementos and personal diaries.

Mora obtained various patents.  One included a system to project films without a screen (using a column of vapor), as well as systems for mining.

Mora was the subject of the 1996 film "Lola Mora", directed by Argentine director Javier Torre.

Works
Mora's works include (in Buenos Aires unless otherwise noted):
 two bas-reliefs at the House of Tucumán, with the themes of the May Revolution's First National Government and the Declaration of Independence, 1900
 the Nereids Fountain, now located at Puerto Madero, 1903
 two major sculptural groups flanking the entrance, and other interior and exterior work, Palace of the Argentine National Congress, inaugurated 1906 (four allegorical sculptures of Peace, Justice, Liberty and Progress were moved to the grounds of the Government House of San Salvador de Jujuy)
 several sculpture groups placed along the "Oath Passage" in the historic centre of Rosario, leading to the National Flag Memorial
 female figure for the crypt of Ramon Lopez Lecube, La Recoleta Cemetery, circa 1912
 Avellaneda Memorial, Plaza Alsina, Avellaneda, 1913
 Liberty, Independence Square, San Miguel de Tucumán
 Monument to Francisco Narciso de Laprida, San José de Jáchal

References

External links

 VisiteTuc.com - A site about Tucumán
 Practicosas.com.ar - A women's site with a romantic biography
 Municipality of Jujuy - Official website
 Universidad Nacional de Rosario - Pictures of the Oath Passage in Rosario, flanked by Lola Mora's sculptures

1866 births
1936 deaths
Argentine inventors
Argentine women sculptors
People from Salta Province
People from Tucumán Province
19th-century Argentine sculptors
20th-century Argentine sculptors
19th-century Argentine women artists
20th-century Argentine women artists
Women inventors